Tommy English may refer to:
Tommy English (footballer) (born 1961), English footballer
Tommy English (loyalist) (1960–2000), Northern Irish activist and politician
Tommy English (producer) (born 1986), American producer and songwriter